Loxostege phaeoneuralis is a moth in the family Crambidae. It was described by George Hampson in 1900. It is found in Turkmenistan.

References

Moths described in 1900
Pyraustinae